The first Portugal captain was Cândido de Oliveira, who captained Portugal in the international match against Spain on 18 December 1921. This was his only international appearance. Vítor Gonçalves captained Portugal in their first international on home soil, on 17 December 1922 against the same opposition. The current individual with the most caps, as captain of the Portugal team is Cristiano Ronaldo.

List of captains

Unofficial captaincies 
The following players captained a side in a FIFA-declared unofficial match. Nevertheless, the Portuguese Football Federation has decided to award caps to the intervening footballers and as a result these matches were taken into account in the above table.

Footnotes

References 

Captains
Portugal
Association football player non-biographical articles